Rytmihäiriö (Finnish for 'arrhythmia') is a Finnish hardcore punk, thrash metal/crossover thrash, grindcore and surmacore Helsinki-based band established in 1988 until 1992, when the band was put on a hiatus. It had a comeback in 1998 with a number of changes in the line-up. The band is signed to Sakara Records, and for distribution Sony.

Band has taken their main inspiration from occultism, devil worship, Finnish mixed drink Gambina and Finnish crime magazine Alibi.

Members
Current lineup
 Unto "Une" Helo – vocals (2002–present)
 Janne Perttilä – guitars (1998–present)
 Antti Kiiski – bass (1988-1992, 1998–present) 
 Jukka "Kosmo" Kröger – drums (2017–present) 

Original band
Kalle Ellilä, vocals (1988-1989, died 2003) - replaced by
Pate Vuorio, vocals (1989–1991, 1998-2002) - replaced by
Silveri, vocals (1991-1992)
Marko Karimo, vocals (1991–1992)
Tuukka Laitinen, guitar (first period, 1988–1989) - replaced by
EQ, guitar (1989) replaced by
Nastis, guitar (1989–90), replaced by
Tuukka Laitinen, guitar (second period 1990-1991) -replaced by
Samppa (guitar, 1991–1992)
Antti Kiiski – bass (1988-1992, 1998-)
Otto Luotonen – drums (1988-1992, 1998-2016)

Discography
Studio albums

Compilation albums
1991: Möfaa puujumalille (self-published)
2003: Surman vuodet – The Homicide Years  (Mörri Records)

Split albums
1992: The End of Evolution... ...is Round the Corner (Spinefarm Records)
The End of Evolution... - by Rytmihäiriö 
...is Round the Corner - by Amen
2004: Chaosbreed / Rytmihäiriö  (Homorock Records)
Chaosbreed - by Chaosbreed
Rytmihäiriö - by Rytmihäiriö

EPs
1990: Surmatyö  (Surmatyö Records)
1990: Ihmisiä kuolee!  (Spinefarm Records)
2003: Surmaa kännissä  (Hukkalevyt, free download)

Collaboration - Singles as Mokoma / Rytmihäiriö / Stam1na

References

External links
www.surmacore.com Official website 
Sakara Records Official Records

Finnish thrash metal musical groups
1988 establishments in Finland
Musical groups established in 1988
1998 establishments in Finland
1992 disestablishments
Musical groups disestablished in 1992
Crossover thrash groups
Finnish hardcore punk groups